The 1978 Custom Credit Australian Indoor Championships was a men's tennis tournament played on indoor hard courts at the Hordern Pavilion in Sydney, Australia and was part of the 1978 Colgate-Palmolive Grand Prix. The tournament was held from 16 October through 22 October 1978. First-seeded Jimmy Connors won the singles title.

Finals

Singles

 Jimmy Connors defeated  Geoff Masters 6–0, 6–0, 6–4
 It was Connors' 10th title of the year and the 84th of his career.

Doubles

 John Newcombe /  Tony Roche defeated  Mark Edmondson /  John Marks 6–4, 6–3
 It was Newcombe's only title of the year and the 65th of his career. It was Roche's 2nd title of the year and the 27th of his career.

References

External links
 ITF tournament edition details

 
Custom Credit Australian Indoor Championships
Australian Indoor Tennis Championships
In
Custom Credit Australian Indoor Championships
Sports competitions in Sydney
Tennis in New South Wales